The Bangladesh national football team is the national recognised football team of Bangladesh and is controlled by the Bangladesh Football Federation (BFF). It is a member of the Asian Football Confederation, and became a member of FIFA in 1974, even though the Bangladesh Football Federation was first founded in 1972. Bangladesh was elected as a member of the AFC Executive Committee in 1982–1986 and 1998–2002. The current Executive Committee was elected democratically, under an AFC approved constitution and direct supervision of FIFA & AFC, in October 2020.

Bangladesh's national team debuted in 1973 and has yet to qualify for the FIFA World Cup finals. They were dismissed in the first round of their only Asian Cup appearance to date in 1980; by qualifying for it, Bangladesh is one of the only two South Asian nations to achieve the feat. The nation's best results came at South Asian level where it won the 2003 SAFF Championship and were gold medalists at the 1999 South Asian Games. Bangladesh was one of Asia's emerging team's in the 1980s and early 1990s. However, since the turn of the century, top-level football in Bangladesh is played somewhere in the shadow of the country's national cricket team. This is mostly due to inadequate budget allocation and lack of technical skills adaptation. To date, football remains a popular sport in Bangladesh but cricket remains the most popular sport in the nation.

History

Origins (1933–1972)

During the early 1930s, there were many tournaments being held in East Bengal and it was seen that the Bengalis there were getting a little better at football. So in 1933, Dhaka Sporting Association, also known as the DSA, was formed in a small tin house at Paltan Maidan in Dhaka. In those days, Islington Corinthians from England toured all around the world, and introduced their football to every country they visited. On 22 November 1937, the team visited Dhaka, where they took on the DSA XI. The Bengalis of Dhaka handed Corinthians their first ever loss, when the DSA XI defeated Corinthians 1–0 during their encounter. Most of the players were students of Dhaka University. Thousands of people were overjoyed to see the English lose on the field that day. While leaving, the opposition admitted to their defeat, saying, "I heard a lot about the Bengal tiger! This time I saw it!"

The first instance of a Bangladesh national football team was the emergence of the Shadhin Bangla Football Team during the 1971 Liberation War. They toured throughout India and helped fund the provisional Bangladesh government, by handing over all the prize money they earned from playing exhibition games during their tour. After gaining independence from Pakistan on 26 March 1971, a de facto national team called Dhaka XI was active the following year. The team won a highly anticipated friendly against Mohun Bagan on home soil and also finished runners-up at India's Bordoloi Trophy.

Emergence (1973–1984)
The Bangladesh Football Federation (BFF) was founded on 15 July 1972, by Md. Yousuf Ali, the country's former Minister of Education and Cultural Affairs. The BFF became affiliated with the AFC in 1973, and FIFA in 1976. The newly formed federation put Dhaka XI head coach Sheikh Shaheb Ali incharge of the first official national team, while Zakaria Pintoo who also lead the Shadhin Bangla Team before liberation, was named captain. In July 1973, Bangladesh were invited to take part in the Merdeka Cup, held in Malaysia, along with Pintoo the first national team squad consisted of: Shahidur Shantoo, Motaleb, Nannu, Nazir, Dilip Barua, Ashraf, Farukh, Abdul Hakim, Sharif, Md.Kaikobad, Enayetur Rahman, Kazi Salahuddin, Pratap, Sunil Krishna, Firoj and Nowsher.

On 26 July 1973, the Bangladesh football team played its first official game, a 2–2 draw against Thailand in the Merdeka Cup. Enayetur Rahman scored the country's first ever international goal and the second goal was scored by fellow striker Kazi Salahuddin. After the stalemate, the game went to penalties, where Bangladesh lost 0–1. On 13 August 1973, after concluding their journey in Malaysia the team played a friendly in Singapore, and earned their first ever win by defeating the hosts 1–0, thanks to a goal from Nowsher. In August 1975, Bangladesh were again invited to partake in the Merdeka Cup held in Kuala Lumpur, Malaysia. During their underwhelming tournament, the players were informed about the Assassination of Sheikh Mujibur Rahman, and decided to abandon the tournament to return home amidst the political unrest. However, fearing a FIFA ban the team was obliged to play their game with South Korea, making a symbolic protest by keeping the Bangladesh flag at half-mast and wearing a black badge, as they lost 0–4.

Aside from competing in the 1976 King's Cup, Bangladesh remained inactive until 1978, when Werner Bickelhaupt was appointed as the country's first foreign coach. The team experienced internal conflict going into the 1978 Asian games in Bangkok, as the captaincy was stripped of the senior most player Monwar Hossain Nannu of Abahani and handed over to Shahidur Rahman Shantoo from Mohammedan SC, seven players from Abahani including Nannu quit the team in protest. The much depleted Bangladesh team struggled in the tournament losing to both Malaysia and India. Following this incident, the federation attempted to pick captains outside the two Dhaka teams for the next few years. In March 1979, the 1980 AFC Asian Cup qualifiers began on home soil and surprisingly considering that this was their first time taking part in a qualifying tournament, Bangladesh guided by local trainer Anwar Hossain, opened their campaign with draws against Afghanistan and Qatar. The team then went on to claim only their second ever victory by defeating the Afghans 3–2, which was eventually enough for them to qualify for the main event.

The 1980 AFC Asian Cup was held in September in Kuwait, and Bangladesh were grouped with defending champions Iran as well as North Korea, Syria and China. The team now coached by Abdur Rahim, opened the tournament respectably with a narrow 3–2 defeat against North Korea. Their goals came from Kazi Salahuddin and Ashrafuddin Ahmed Chunnu. They also held on well against Syria, losing 0–1. However, the next couple of games saw Bangladesh being embarrassed 7–0 and 6–0 respectively, by Iran and China, finishing the tournament bottom of their table. Bangladesh continued their continental exploits, as a goal from Badal Roy against Malaysia at the 1982 Asian Games, gave the team their first ever win in Asia's biggest stage at the time. Despite of all their early success, the team would see a slump in form, failing to qualify for the 1984 AFC Asian Cup and also endured a painful defeat to Nepal in the 1984 South Asian Games final.

Rise and Fall (1985–2002)

In 1985, Bangladesh took part in the 1986 World Cup qualifiers, and were grouped along with India, Indonesia and Thailand. The country's first ever win at the qualifiers came against Indonesia. The game was held at the Bangladesh Army Stadium, and the under-pressure home team had overturned a single goal deficit through Kaiser Hamid and Ashrafuddin Ahmed Chunnu. They followed up the Indonesia result by edging past Thailand 1–0 in the next game. Nonetheless, the team finished bottom of the group, behind Thailand on goal difference. In the wake of their first World Cup qualifying campaign, Bangladesh took part in the 1985 South Asian Games as one of the favorites. The team cruised through the group-stages, claiming their biggest ever win in an 8–0 thrashing of Maldives along the way, but luck was not on their side, losing to India on penalties in the final. During the 1990 World Cup qualifiers, the team only registered a single victory, which came in a 3–1 thrashing of Thailand. Despite the solitary victory, Bangladesh fought toe-to-toe with Asian giants Iran and China during both legs.

Iranian legend Nasser Hejazi took charge of Bangladesh at the 1989 South Asian Games, and dropped experienced players (Sheikh Aslam, Wasim Iqbal and Mohsin) from the squad. After error-prone Bangladesh lost to Pakistan in the final, the former Mohammedan SC coach Hejazi was accused of having a bias against players from rival club Abahani. In 1995, following a series of managerial changes, Otto Pfister was appointed as coach. On 4 November 1995, with Pfister handing the team's captaincy to Monem Munna, Bangladesh won the 4-nation Tiger Trophy in Myanmar, which was the nation's very first major trophy. The year 1996 saw Bangladesh being ranked 110 by FIFA, however, they failed to add to their success, finishing runner-up at the 1995 South Asian Games and 1999 SAFF Gold Cup. It was at the 1999 South Asian Games where the Bangladesh team coached by Samir Shaker ended their 19-year wait for a gold medal, defeating hosts Nepal in the final.

On 12 January 2001, a historic moment occurred for the Bangladesh team, as they played their first match against a European nation, when they took on Bosnia & Herzegovina during the Sahara Cup and lost 2–0. On 18 March 2001, Firoz Mahmud Titu became the first Bangladeshi player to score against European opposition, as Bangladesh suffered a 4–1 defeat at the hands of Yugoslavia during the same competition. The team proceeded to grow more and more despondent, suffering elimination from the first Round of 2002 World Cup qualifiers with only 1 win from 4 games. On 11 January 2002, FIFA imposed a ban on Bangladesh, due to the government violating the FIFA and AFC law that only recognizes a democratically elected committee to run a country's football federation. Nonetheless, the ban was short lived, after the government reinstated the elected committee of Bangladesh Football Federation, FIFA lifted the ban, on 11 February.

SAFF Gold Cup triumph (2003) 

After failing to produce satisfactory results in the previous two years, coach György Kottán remained incharge of Bangladesh during the 2003 SAFF Championship which took place in Dhaka, between 10 January 2003 and 20 January 2003. Hosts Bangladesh started off the tournament by winning their opening game against Nepal (1–0), with Alfaz Ahmed scoring the only goal, 30 minutes into the match. In the following game, the team again won by a solitary goal, thanks to a late strike from Arif Khan Joy against Maldives. Bangladesh topped their group after winning the last game 3–0 against Bhutan, with goals coming from Farhad and Kanchan. In the semifinals they faced India, who were the defending champions after defeating Bangladesh in the final in 1999. Bangladesh avenged their defeat from four years earlier by overcoming India 2–1, owing to a Golden goal by Motiur Munna and thus progressing to their second consecutive SAFF Championship final. However, before the final the Bangladesh team dealt a huge blow, as their captain Rajani Kanta Barman who played in every game during the tournament until then, picked up a suspension, denying him a chance to play in the next match. In the final Bangladesh again faced Maldives, Hassan Al-Mamun replaced Rajani in defense and took up the captain's armband before the game. Rokonuzzaman Kanchan gave the hosts the early lead and Bangladesh spent the rest of the first half dominating possession. During the second half a defensive blunder by Bangladesh lead to Ali Umar scoring the equalizer. The game remained tied at 1–1 after 90 minutes and even after another 30 minutes of extra time the two sides could not be separated. In the penalty shootout, goalkeeper Aminul Haque saved the second penalty from Maldives and at last Mohammed Sujan held his nerves and scored the winning penalty, as Bangladesh secured their first SAFF Championship in front of 46,000 supporters present at the Bangabandhu National Stadium.

Inconsistency (2003–2010)

The 2004 AFC Cup qualifiers, began from March 2003. It was another devastating qualifying campaign for Bangladesh, suffering a defeat at the hands of Laos and tying against Hong Kong, concluded the country's AFC Cup qualification hopes. The team did show signs of improvement by reaching the final of the 2005 Saff Championship, only to be defeated by India in the final again. From December 2005, Bangladesh began their 2007 AFC Asian Cup qualification campaign, winning only a single game in the process, before once again failing to reach the main phase of the competition. The 2008 SAFF Cup also ended in huge disappointment, as Bangladesh were knocked out of the tournament during the group-stages, even after the BFF introduced the Bangladesh Premier League the previous year to improve the country's football. Their underwhelming SAFF campaign resulted in the dismissal of coach of Abu Yusuf. He was replaced by former national team player Shafiqul Islam Manik, who only lasted at the job for another three months.

On 24 January 2009, Bangladesh appointed Brazilian coach Dido. Under his guidance the team saw an upturn in results, winning two of the three 2010 AFC Challenge Cup qualifiers and advanced into the main tournament. However, he was sacked within 11 months as he refused to select established national team players. During his last interview before leaving Bangladesh, Dido criticized the country's footballing structure and stated that it was corrupt. This again raised questions about BFF president Kazi Salahuddin's management of the country's football. The 2009 SAFF Championship saw Bangladesh once again hosting the tournament. Former national team keeper Shahidur Rahman Shantoo was appointed as the interim coach just a few days before the tournament. His time at the job was also short lived, as the hosts were knocked out in the semi-final by eventual champions India. The deterioration in results over the following decade and more saw a massive decline in popularity of the country's football among fans, in both domestic and international stage.

Decline (2011–present)
On 29 June 2011, after a goalless away leg, Bangladesh beat Pakistan 3–0 on aggregate, at Dhaka, during the 2014 FIFA World Cup qualifiers–first round, the game took place only four days after Nikola Ilievski was appointed as the team's head coach. This allowed Bangladesh to advance to the second round to face Lebanon. The first game was played in Beirut on 23 July 2011, where the hosts won 4–0. The return game in Dhaka saw Bangladesh being eliminated, even after they managed to salvage a 2–0 victory against the middle eastern giants. However, the dearth of quality players was evident as the nation failed to win a single game during the entirety of the 2011 SAFF Championship. In January 2013, Lodewijk de Kruif took charge of the team, and under him they even failed to advance from the 2014 AFC Challenge Cup qualifiers, a tournament held to assist lower ranked teams. Bangladesh played their first four games of the 2018 FIFA World Cup qualifiers against Kyrgyzstan, Tajikistan, Australia and Jordan, losing all of the matches apart from their home game against Tajikistan where they drew 1–1. These results lead to De Kruif being sacked, in September 2015. In March 2016, Bangladesh ended their 2018 World Cup Qualifying run with an 8–0 defeat at the hands of a Jordan team managed by Harry Redknapp.

On 29 June 2016, the BFF appointed Belgian coach Tom Saintfiet, initially on a short-term contract to guide the national team during the AFC Asia Cup 2019 qualification playoff round 2 matches against Bhutan. Coach Saintfiet called up the veteran striking pair of Jahid Hasan Ameli and Enamul Haque for the encounter, but to no avail. Following a 0–0 draw in the first leg in Dhaka, Bhutan inflicted a 3–1 defeat on Bangladesh at the Changlimithang Stadium in Thimphu during the second leg. The results meant Bangladesh would not be a part of any AFC and FIFA tournaments for the following two years, until the launching of the 2022 FIFA World Cup and the 2023 Asian Cup qualifiers. By February 2018, Bangladesh plummeted to 197 in FIFA World Rankings, the country's lowest ranking to date. On May 2018, Jamie Day took charge of the team. Although the team was a let down during the 2018 SAFF Championship, Bangladesh advanced to the second round of the 2022 World Cup qualifiers when they defeated Laos 1–0 on aggregate. In the next round, they were grouped together with neighbors India and Afghanistan, alongside Asian powerhouses Qatar and  Oman. The team managed to earn well deserved draws against India and Afghanistan, and although they suffered some heavy defeats in the following games, Bangladesh reached the third round of 2023 AFC Asian Cup qualifiers, as  one of the three best fifth-positioned teams. In September 2021, after five consecutive defeats, Day was sacked, just before the 2021 SAFF Championship got underway. However, interim coach Óscar Bruzón, was not able to change the country's fate, as Bangladesh yet again underwhelmed at the tournament.

Javier Cabrera (2022–)
On 8 January 2022, the BFF appointed Javier Cabrera as the permanent head coach of Bangladesh, on an 11-month contract. Under Cabrera Bangladesh crashed out of the 2023 AFC Asian Cup qualifiers–third round, failing to gain a single victory.

Team image

Media coverage
Bangladesh's home and away qualifiers and friendlies are broadcast live on Bangladesh Television, Bangla TV & T Sports (Bangladesh).

Kits

The Bangladesh national football team plays in bottle green shirts and dark red shorts embedded. Also with red and green stripes. Green and red are the historic national colors of Bangladesh, originating from its the national flag. The red represents the sun rising over Bengal, and also the blood of those who died for the country's independence, while the green represents the lushness of its land. The usual Bangladesh away jersey is completely diametric to the regular one, and similar to most national teams Bangladesh uses the country's footballing federation as a logo on the kit.

On 14 July 2008, Bangladesh Football Federation struck a landmark sponsorship deal with Citycell worth US$1.45 million for two years (2008–2010), which was biggest ever trade in the country's football history until then.

In 2010, BFF announced Grameenphone as their new sponsor and kit provider on a three-year contract (2010–2013). After half a decade without a sponsor, India's TVS Motor Company tied up with the Bangladesh national team for the 2018 FIFA World Cup qualification – AFC Second Round, in a deal which lasted for two years (2019–2021). In 2021, as the Bangladesh team was using the same kit for almost 5 years, the federation decided to hold a jersey designing contest for the 2021 SAFF Championship.

Supporters
In the early 70s and 80s the national football team attracted fans from all over the country. Footballs popularity skyrocketed among fans as a result of the country's well renowned league. The Dhaka League produced many popular footballers, and in turn increased the attendance rate when the fan favorites from the domestic clubs got called up to represent the national team. Since the turn of the century, football's popularity has seen a huge fall, both among fans and media. This is a result of success in other sports and the football team's failure to produce results on the pitch. Recent times have seen the 36,000 seats of Bangabandhu National Stadium in Dhaka usually remain idle all year round.

Outside the capital, football's popularity has not faded away, with games in Sylhet and Jessore, drawing tons of fans. In September 2014, 50,000 spectators were present when Bangladesh U23 team took on Nepal U23, at the Sylhet District Stadium. It was reported that the fans entered the stadium by breaking the main entrance, due to shortage in tickets. The same year at the Shamsul Huda Stadium in  Jessore, which has a capacity of 12,000 was filled with more than 30,000 viewers during a friendly match against Sri Lanka, where the hosts won 1–0.

Bangladesh Red and Green
The President's Gold Cup which was predominantly held every year from 1981 to 1993, saw the Bangladesh Football Federation enter two teams for Bangladesh; Bangladesh Blue and White in 1987 tournament and Bangladesh Red and Green during the 1989.
This was due to the fact, that during the 80s many players were not able to get into the national team even after performing well in the country's Dhaka League, leading the federation to launch two separate teams, one with regular senior international players and the other with "second string" international players. Having a two separate teams  was very common during the 80s and 90s for developing South Asian country's, both Nepal and Pakistan had second string team's. Most international countries taking part in the President's Gold Cup would not send their main national team, instead the tournament would be used as a platform to play their B team's.

The 1989 President's Gold Cup saw the Bangladesh Red team win the tournament. The hosts guided by goalkeeper Sayeed Hassan Kanan, defeated South Korea University football team in penalties to lift the trophy, while the Green team were knocked out in the group stages. The Green team was seen as the B, and consisted of U-21 team, while the Red team was made out of senior international's, and was known to be the main national team. While during the 1987 edition of the tournament, Bangladesh White team and Blue team took part. The White team mainly consisted players from Mohammedan SC, while the Blue team was made of players from rival club Abahani Limited.

Home stadium

Bangladesh plays majority of their home matches at the Bangabandhu National Stadium, Dhaka, where they won the 2003 SAFF Championship and 2010 South Asian Games. Previously known as the Dhaka Stadium it was initially constructed in 1954, the Bangladesh Football Federation was given full authority to operate the stadium in 2004, and before that the Mirpur Stadium would regularly host home matches.

Before renovation in 2011, the Bangabundhu Stadium had a capacity close to 55,000, but with a new capacity of 36,000 it is still the largest stadium in Bangladesh. Ever since the inception of the Bangladesh Premier League, in 2007, the stadium has been used to host majority of the league games. It has hosted the SAFF Championship on three occasions, in 2003, 2009 and most recently in 2018.

In 2021, the Bangabandhu Stadium, again underwent renovation, which has been scheduled to last for over a year. The new refurbishments will see addition of chairs in galleries and installation of LED giant screens. The renovation is part of Bangladesh Football Federation's plan of giving the nation a modernized stadium more suited for football.  Occasionally home matches are also played at Sheikh Kamal Stadium in Nilphamari, Sylhet District Stadium in Sylhet, Rajshahi District Stadium in Rajshahi and Shamsul Huda Stadium in Jessore.

Results and fixtures

Matches in the last 12 months, and future scheduled matches

2022

2023

Coaching staff

Coaching history
Interim coaches are listed in italics.

  Sheikh Shaheb Ali (1972–1973)
  Abdur Rahim (1975)
  Anjam Hossain (1976)
  Werner Bickelhaupt (1978)
  Anwar Hossain (1979)
  Sheikh Shaheb Ali (1979)
  Abdur Rahim (1980)
  Abdul Gafur Baloch (1981–1982)
  Abdur Rahim (1982)
  Gerd Schmidt (1982)
  Abdur Rahim (1983)
  Golam Sarwar Tipu (1984)
  Ali Imam (1984)
  Abdur Rahim (1985)
  Golam Sarwar Tipu (1985)
  Kazi Salahuddin (1985–1986)
  Abdul Hakim (1986)
  Golam Sarwar Tipu (1986)
  Ali Imam (1986)
  Mohammad Kaikobad (1987)
  Wazed Gazi (1987)
  Abdur Rahim (1987)
  Kazi Salahuddin (1987–1988)
  Abdus Sadek (1989)
  Pran Govinda Kundu (1989)
  Nasser Hejazi (1989)
  Abdur Rahim (1990)
  Shahid Uddin Ahmed Selim (1991)
  Mohammad Kaikobad (1992–1993)
  Kazi Salahuddin (1993)
  Oldrich Swab (1993)
  Kazi Salahuddin (1994)
  Kang Man-young (1995)
  Otto Pfister (1995–1997)
  Abu Yusuf (1998)
  Samir Shaker (1999)
  Mark Harrison (2000)
  Hasanuzzaman Bablu (2000)
  György Kottán (2000–2003)
  Hasanuzzaman Bablu (2003)
  Golam Sarwar Tipu (2003)
  Andres Cruciani (2005–2006)
  Hasanuzzaman Bablu (2006)
  Syed Nayeemuddin (2007–2008)
  Hasanuzzaman Bablu (2007)
  Abu Yusuf (2008)
  Shafiqul Islam Manik (2008)
  Dido (2009)
  Shahidur Rahman Shantoo (2009)
  Zoran Đorđević (2010)
  Saiful Bari Titu (2010)
  Robert Rubčić (2010–2011)
  Nikola Ilievski (2011)
  Saiful Bari Titu (2012)
  Lodewijk de Kruif (2013–2014)
  Saiful Bari Titu (2014–2015)
  Lodewijk de Kruif (2015)
  Fabio Lopez (2015)
  Maruful Haque (2015–2016)
  Gonzalo Sanchez Moreno (2016)
  Lodewijk de Kruif (2016)
  Tom Saintfiet (2016)
   Andrew Ord (2017–2018)
  Jamie Day (2018–2022)
  Óscar Bruzón (2021)
  Mário Lemos (2021)
  Javier Cabrera (2022–present)

Coaching record

Players

Current squad
The following players were named in the provisional squad for the two friendly matches against Seychelles on 23 and 28 March 2023.

Caps and goals are correct as of 27 September 2022, after the game against .

Recent call-ups
The following players have also been called up to the Bangladesh squad within the last twelve months.

INJ Withdrew due to injury
PRE Preliminary squad / standby
COV Withdrew due to COVID-19
RET Retired from the national team
SUS Serving suspension
WD Player withdrew from the squad due to non-injury issue.

Player records

Players in bold are still active with Bangladesh.

Most appearances

NB The list is inaccurate as Alfaz Ahmed & Hassan Al-Mamun each, reportedly have over 65 caps - however exact figures are not yet known by the Bangladesh Football Federation. Also caps for long serving players such as Ashish Bhadra, Monem Munna, Badal Roy & Khurshid Alam Babul, along with many others - are still unknown by the Federation and is still being researched.

Top goalscorers

NB The list is inaccurate as Khandoker Wasim Iqbal & Mamun Joarder both, reportedly have over 10 goals - however exact figures are not yet known by the Bangladesh Football Federation and is still being updated.

Competitive record

FIFA World Cup record

AFC Asian Cup record

SAFF Championship

South Asian Games

AFC Challenge Cup

Asian Games

Head-to-head record

.

Honours
 SAFF Championship
  Champions (1): 2003
  Runner-up (2): 1999, 2005
  Third-Place (2): 1995
 South Asian Games
  Gold medal (1): 1999
  Silver medal (4): 1984, 1985, 1989, 1995
  Bronze medal (1): 1991
 Bangabandhu Gold Cup
  Runner-up (1): 2015
 Quaid-e-Azam International Cup
  Runner-up (1): 1985
  Third-place (1): 1987
 President's Gold Cup
  Champions (1): 1989
 4-nation Tiger Trophy
  Champions (1): 1995
 Myanmar Grand Royal Challenge Cup
  Runner-up (1): 2005
 Jigme Dorji Wangchuk Memorial Trophy
  Champions (1): 2003
 Mujib Borsho FIFA International Football Series
  Champions (1): 2020
 Three Nations Cup
  Runner-up (1): 2021

See also
 Football in Bangladesh
 Bangladesh Football Federation
 Bangladesh national football team performances
 Bangladesh women's national football team
 List of football stadiums in Bangladesh
 Youth Teams
 Bangladesh national under-23 football team
 Bangladesh national under-20 football team
 Bangladesh national under-17 football team

References

External links

  of the Bangladesh Football Federation
 Bangladesh profile at FIFA.com (archived 20 January 2008)
 ELO team records

 
Asian national association football teams
National sports teams established in 1973